is a city located on the eastern shore of the Izu Peninsula in Shizuoka Prefecture, Japan. ,  the city had an estimated population of 68,773 in 36,717 households  and a population density of 550 persons per km².

Geography

Itō is located in eastern Shizuoka Prefecture, on the northeast corner of Izu Peninsula, facing Sagami Bay on the Pacific Ocean. The landscape is hilly, and the heavily indented coastline is scenic. Much of the coastal area of the city is within the Fuji-Hakone-Izu National Park. The city is located within the Izu-Tobu volcanic zone, and is subject to frequent earthquakes. The area is noted for its onsen hot spring resorts.

Surrounding municipalities
Shizuoka Prefecture
Atami
Izu
Izunokuni
Higashiizu

Demographics
Per Japanese census data, the population of Itō peaked in around the year 2000, and has declined slightly since.

Climate
The city has a climate characterized by hot and humid summers, and relatively mild winters (Köppen climate classification Cfa).  The average annual temperature in Itō is 14.8 °C. The average annual rainfall is 2200 mm with September as the wettest month. The temperatures are highest on average in August, at around 25.1 °C, and lowest in January, at around 5.3 °C.

History
During the Edo period, all of Izu Province was tenryō territory under direct control of the Tokugawa shogunate, and the area now comprising Itō was occupied by 15 small farming and fishing hamlets. It was in this area that the Tokugawa shogunate ordered Englishman William Adams to construct Japan's first western-style sailing vessels in 1604. The first ship, an 80-ton vessel, was used for surveying work, and the second ship, the 120-ton San Buena Ventura was sailed to Mexico. The period is commemorated in Itō by a street named after Adams (Anjinmiuradori). The area was reorganized into four villages (Tsushima, Itō, Komuro and Usami) within Kamo District with the establishment of the modern municipalities system in the early Meiji period in 1889, and was transferred to Tagata District in 1896. On January 1, 1906 the village of Itō was elevated to town status. It annexed neighboring Komuro Village on August 10, 1947 and became the city of Itō. In 1950 Itō was proclaimed an "International Tourism and Cultural City" by the central government. It further expanded through annexation of neighboring Tsushima and Usami villages on April 1, 1955.

Government
Itō has a mayor-council form of government with a directly elected mayor and a unicameral city legislature of 20 members. The city contributes one member to the Shizuoka Prefectural Assembly.

Economy
Itō is one of the well known hot spring resort towns near the greater Tokyo metropolis, and tourism is the mainstay of the economy. Commercial fishing and the production of stockfish form a secondary economy.

Education
Itō has ten public elementary schools and five public middle schools operated by the city government and two public high schools operated by the Shizuoka Prefectural Board of Education. In addition, the prefecture also operates one special education school for the disabled.

Transportation

Railway
  East Japan Railway Company - Itō Line
  - 
   Izukyu Corporation - Izu Kyūkō Line
  -  -  -  -  -

Highways

Sister city relations
 - Suwa, Nagano prefecture, Japan, from May 20, 1965
 - Medway, United Kingdom, from August 10, 1982
 - Rieti, Italy, from July 21, 1985
 - Ismayilli, Azerbaijan, from  2013

Local attractions
Itō Onsen
Usami Onsen
Akazawa Onsen
Jōgasaki Coast 
Mount Ōmuro

Notable people from Itō
Mokutaro Kinoshita - author
Eiji Tsuburaya - Japanese special effects director responsible for many Japanese science-fiction films and television series, co-creator of Godzilla and the creator of Ultra Series (Originally from Sukagawa, Fukushima, resided in Itō until his death)
Ryuji Hara - professional boxer
Ichiro Ogimura - table tennis player, coach, president of the ITTF and former World No. 1 who won 12 World Championship titles during his career

Itō in media
Itō is featured extensively in the manga Amanchu! by Kozue Amano.
Itō is where takes place the aquatic battle between unit Eva-02 and one enemy angel in the anime Neon Genesis Evangelion, under the sea level in the story.
In the manga Inuyasha, the protagonist Kagome Higurashi's home is based on the real Higurashi Shrine located in Itō.

References

External links 

  
  

 
Cities in Shizuoka Prefecture
Populated coastal places in Japan